Matilda Alice Williams (1875–1973) was a New Zealand Methodist deaconess. She was born in Alexandra, Victoria, Australia in 1875.

References

1875 births
1973 deaths
New Zealand Methodists
People from Victoria (Australia)
Australian emigrants to New Zealand